Raciborów may refer to the following places:
Raciborów, Greater Poland Voivodeship (west-central Poland)
Raciborów, Łódź Voivodeship (central Poland)
Raciborów, West Pomeranian Voivodeship (north-west Poland)